Keep Fit is a 1937 British comedy film directed by Anthony Kimmins and starring George Formby, Kay Walsh and Guy Middleton. Formby was at his British top box-office peak when this comedy was made.

Synopsis
George Formby again plays his working class underdog, gormless, gullible, indefatigable and triumphant hero. A weakling, Formby's character overcomes obstacles to beat a corrupt rival in the boxing ring. He plays a scrawny barber's assistant who, in response to the keep fit fad sweeping through Britain at the time, dreams of a better physique, and sings of it in the catchy "Biceps, Muscle and Brawn". He falls in love with a beautiful manicurist, and competes for her affections with a muscle bound thug. The manicurist is more attracted to the brute until the barber can prove that he is a crook, and defeat him in the boxing ring.

Cast
 George Formby as George Green
 Kay Walsh as Joan Allen
 Guy Middleton as Hector Kent
 George Benson as Ernie Gill
 Gus McNaughton as "Echo" Publicity Manager
 Evelyn Roberts as Mr Barker
 Aubrey Mallalieu as Magistrate
 Edmund Breon as Sir Augustus Marks  
 Hal Gordon as Reporter  
 Hal Walters as Racing Tough 
 C. Denier Warren as Editor 
 Edgar Driver as Boat Hire Owner 
 Leo Franklyn as Racing Tough
 Robert Nainby as Judge At The Gym 
 Julian Vedey as Hairdressing Dept Head  
 Jack Vyvian as Boat Hire Man 
 D.J. Williams as Editor of The Gazette

Critical reception
According to Sky Movies "it's a bouncy, confidently made comedy that's fun throughout and pretty hilarious in its boxing-ring conclusion".

References

Further reading

External links 
 

1930s sports comedy films
1937 films
British sports comedy films
British black-and-white films
Associated Talking Pictures
Films directed by Anthony Kimmins
Films set in England
British boxing films
1937 comedy films
1930s English-language films
1930s British films